{{Infobox Comic strip 
| title = Dueling Analogs
| image =
| caption = The Dueling Analogs strip "So Dark the Contra of Man" is an amalgam of The Last Supper (Leonardo) and Konami Code.
| author = Steve Napierski
| url = duelinganalogs.com
| status = Monday & Thursday
| began = November 17, 2005
| genre = Video games, Parody, Gag-a-day
}}Dueling Analogs (a pun on the Dual Analog Controller) is a webcomic by Steve Napierski (also the creator of The Outer Circle). The website was launched on November 17, 2005, and new comics were posted every Monday and Thursday. Dueling Analogs is a gaming comic and as such most of the comics take place in the universe of the games discussed. There are few ongoing stories or plotlines as all of the comics are self-encapsulated (one exception is the trial of King Bowser); however, there are repeated themes such as 'Rejected Mega Man Villains', 'Games that I am glad were never made' and 'What if...?'.  Dueling Analogs is also a founding member of a webcomic group of gaming comics. The comic came to prominence in the webcomic community after the "So Dark the Contra of Man" strip.

On July 31, 2018 Napierski announced that he was no longer going to update the website.

TaglineDueling Analogs is a color semi-weekly webcomic that lampoons the characters, culture and subtext of modern gaming culture

Characters
Harvey – Harvey is the voice of Dueling Analogs.  Whenever the comic needs to talk directly to the audience about a topic, Harvey is there.  Harvey's design is modeled after the look of its creator from his high school years. This is in contrast to the character Steve from The Outer Circle which was modeled after a more recent look of the creator.First Appearance: 2005-11-29, strip 4.
Mario – Though not created by Steve Napierski, Mario has appeared in so many Dueling Analogs strips that he is considered a regular member of the comics cast.First Appearance: 2005-12-01, strip 5.
Jeremy the Sony PR Gnome – The voice of Sony. Jeremy acts as the counterpoint to the voice of Harvey’s pro-Nintendo views. Could possibly be a parody of the gnome from Amélie or the gnome feature in the Travelocity commercials: Where is my Gnome?.First Appearance: 2006-07-31, strip 76.
Xed Box – If Microsoft had a spokesperson in Dueling Analogs, Xed Box would be it. Unfortunately, Xed Box is nothing more than a box with a crudely drawn "X" on it.First Appearance: 2006-08-16, strip 81.
Jon Shelf American – Jon Shelf American is what's considered Dueling Analogs` stereotypical gamer (introvert, unsociable and still living at home with his mother). Name based on George Liquor American created by John Kricfalusi.First Appearance: 2007-01-15, strip 130.

ParodiesDueling Analogs has featured such games as Final Fantasy VII, The Smurfs, Mega Man, Karnov, Super Smash Brothers and Final Fantasy X-2.

Awards and nominationsDueling Analogs has been nominated for two Web Cartoonist's Choice Awards
 2006: Outstanding Gaming Comic, Outstanding Web DesignDueling Analogs has been voted best gaming webcomic of the week by the readers of Joystiq on nine occasions: May 23, 2006, June 3, 2006, June 24, 2006, February 13, 2007, March 27, 2007, May 22, 2007, October 23, 2007, April 23, 2008, May 29, 2008

NotablesDueling Analogs is a featured webcomic on Game Revolution.Dueling Analogs was a monthly comic in Hardcore Gamer Magazine from June through November 2007 .

Reviews
 Article about Dueling Analogs on Destructoid
 BBC Article about webcomics
 Article on 411mania discussing gaming webcomics
 Dueling Analogs Konami Code comic was mentioned in a Tech Republic article.
 Dueling Analogs Living Achievements Vicariously comic was mentioned in a 411mania  article.

Interviews
 Interview with Steve Napierski on Joystiq.
 Author Steve Napierski, was interviewed in Zoinks! Magazine about Dueling Analogs and his other comic, The Outer Circle'' in October 2006.

References

External links
 
 Dueling Analogs on Gamer Revolution
 Steve Napierski's MySpace Page
 Steve Napierski's ComicSpace Page

Video game webcomics
Gag-a-day comics
2005 webcomic debuts
2000s webcomics